Bobby Earl Johnson (born July 31, 1959) is a retired Major League Baseball catcher. He played during three seasons at the major league level for the Texas Rangers. He was drafted by the Rangers in the 9th round of the  amateur draft.

A graduate of Kimball High School in Dallas, Johnson is the nephew of Hall of Fame infielder Ernie Banks.

On April 29, 1983, Johnson hit a 3-run home run against the New York Yankees in an 8–3 win.

Sources

External links
, or Retrosheet, or Pura Pelota (Venezuelan Winter League

1959 births
Living people
African-American baseball players
Asheville Tourists players
Baseball players from Dallas
Charleston Charlies players
Columbus Clippers players
Denver Bears players
Fort Lauderdale Yankees players
Gulf Coast Rangers players
Major League Baseball catchers
Major League Baseball first basemen
Nashville Sounds players
Texas Rangers players
Tiburones de La Guaira players
American expatriate baseball players in Venezuela
Tulsa Drillers players
Wausau Timbers players
Wichita Aeros players
21st-century African-American people
20th-century African-American sportspeople